Idaho is a state in the Pacific Northwest of the United States.

Idaho may also refer to:

Places
Idaho, Ohio, an unincorporated community
Idaho County, Idaho, a county in the state of Idaho
Idaho City, Idaho, a city in Boise County
University of Idaho, in Moscow, Idaho

Music
Idaho (band), a California-based slowcore band
"Idaho" (Jesse Stone song), a jazz song written by Jesse Stone
"Idaho" (Feeder song), a song by British band Feeder
"Private Idaho", a song by The B-52's from the 1980 album Wild Planet
"Idaho," a song by Nerina Pallot from the 2005 album Fires
"Idaho," a song by Josh Ritter from the 2006 album The Animal Years
"Idaho," a song by Afroman from the 2008 album Waiting to Inhale
"Idaho," a song by Train from the 1998 self-titled album Train
"Idaho," a song by The 4 Seasons from the 1969 album The Genuine Imitation Life Gazette
"Idaho," a song by Gorillaz from the 2018 album The Now Now

Other
Duncan Idaho, a fictional character from the Dune universe
Idaho (serial), a 1925 film serial
Idaho (1943 film), an American film directed by Joseph Kane
Idaho (sidewheeler), a steamboat that ran on the Columbia River and Puget Sound
Idaho, an automobile in the Grand Theft Auto series
Idaho, a character in The Amazing World of Gumball
IDAHO (May 17), an abbreviation for International Day Against Homophobia, Transphobia and Biphobia
USS Idaho, several US Navy ships have been named after the state
Idaho (horse), a thoroughbred racehorse
Idaho (novel), a 2019 novel by Emily Ruskovich

See also